"Foreign Affair" is a song by recording artist Tina Turner. It was written by Tony Joe White and produced by White and Roger Davies for Turner's 1989 album Foreign Affair. Released as a single in 1990, it was released in a variety formats, in certain territories – also as a separate remix single including club mixes by Shep Pettibone.

Critical reception
Pop Rescue complimented Mark Knopfler for "expertly wielding his guitar" on the song, noting that it "has a hard 80's electronic beat to it."

Track listing
European 7" single
"Foreign Affair" (Edit) – 3:44
"Private Dancer" (Live) – 4:53

European CD and 12" single
"Foreign Affair" (One In A Million Club Mix) – 6:54
"Foreign Affair" (Heartbeat Instrumental) – 4:25
"Foreign Affair" (Heartbeat Mix) – 4:24

European 12" single
"Foreign Affair" (Special Feelings Mix) – 4:43
"Foreign Affair" (One In A Million Club Mix) – 6:54
"Foreign Affair" (Heartbeat Mix) – 4:24
"Foreign Affair" (One In A Million Extended Mix) – 7:10

European CD and 12" single (Re-Mix)
"Foreign Affair" (One In A Million Extended Mix) – 7:10
"Foreign Affair" (Special Feelings Instrumental) – 4:43
"Foreign Affair" (Heartbeat Edit) – 4:00

Charts

References

Tina Turner songs
1990 singles
Songs written by Tony Joe White
1989 songs
Capitol Records singles